The 2013 New South Wales bushfires were a series of bushfires in Australia across the state of New South Wales primarily starting, or becoming notable, on 13 October 2013; followed by the worst of the fires beginning in the Greater Blue Mountains Area on 16 and 17 October 2013.

High fuel loads, coupled with warm, dry and windy weather, provided dangerous conditions which fuelled the fires. They all swept everywhere across the state. At the peak of the fires, on the morning of 18 October, over 100 fires were burning across the state. The Premier of New South Wales Barry O'Farrell declared a state of emergency on 20 October, empowering firefighters to evict residents and demolish fire-affected buildings.

The fires were the worst in New South Wales since the 1960s, although they were dwarfed by the 2019-2020 Australia bushfires. , 248 houses and other structures were  destroyed across the state. Two fatalities were attributed to the fires. It was estimated that claims will exceed A$94 million.

Background
On 13 October, the Bureau of Meteorology reported that September 2013 was the warmest on record for NSW. Warm, dry weather and strong winds during September contributed to significant early-season bushfire activity, particularly along the coastal strip. Fires were particularly prevalent on 10 and 26 September, with two homes destroyed in western Sydney, while several homes in northeast NSW were threatened and the M1 Motorway closed near  due to fires on 26 September.

In issuing its forecast for the October to December quarter on 25 September, the Bureau estimated the chance that the maximum temperature will exceed the long-term median maximum temperature are greater than 60% across most of southeast Australia, with odds greater than 70% in parts of the south and east coasts.

At , the temperature peaked at  also on 10 October; with peak windspeed measured at  also from the northwest on 13 October.

The Commissioner of the New South Wales Rural Fire Service, Shane Fitzsimmons , issued an extreme fire danger warning for greater Sydney (including the Blue Mountains and Central Coast), the greater Hunter, and Illawarra/Shoalhaven regions for 10 October.

Chronology
Sunday, 13 October
Sparking power lines at  caused a bushfire that destroyed six homes.
A fire was ignited at  that would eventually burn , allegedly started by two boys, aged eleven and fifteen.
A fire that was ignited at Raymond Terrace also on the same day, was allegedly started by the same eleven-year-old boy.
Tuesday, 15 October
The Premier announced the arrival from Greece of the Gypsy Lady, a firefighting air-crane, declaring that it was immediately deployed to fight bush fires.
Wednesday, 16 October
The State Mine fire was ignited near , on Australian Defence Force land by an explosives training exercise.
Thursday, 17 October

The Hall Road fire was ignited near Balmoral by powerlines. The cause of the Linksview fire has not yet been determined however the cause is alleged to have been powerlines in a damages lawsuit, and quickly spread to Winmalee and Yellow Rock, ultimately destroying 193 houses and damaging approximately 100.

An underground coal fire reignites the Rutleys Rd fire (30 September) causing the fire to break containment. The fire quickly spread to Lake Munmorah, Chain Valley Bay, Munmorah State Recreation Area and Catherine Hill Bay and ultimately destroying 4 properties and damaging a further 7.

Friday, 18 October
The NSW Government appointed Phil Koperberg to the position of Blue Mountains Bushfire Recovery Coordinator.
Saturday, 19 October

Sunday, 20 October
By midday, the New South Wales Rural Fire Service stated that conditions were deteriorating across the state, with dry north-westerly winds forecast to return.
The Rural Fire Service Commissioner wrote to the Premier requesting that a state of emergency be declared. The Premier approved the declaration.
A fire was ignited near , allegedly started by a boy, aged fourteen.
Monday, 21 October
Tuesday, 22 October
The Rural Fire Service (RFS) announced that overnight back burn efforts forced the deliberate merger of the two fires that originated near Lithgow and Mount Victoria, in the Blue Mountains.
The Bureau of Meteorology issued a fire weather warning for Wednesday, 23 October. An extreme fire danger warning was forecast for the Greater Hunter and Greater Sydney regions; and a severe fire danger warning issued for the NSW North Coast.
The warning triggered the closure of all government, Catholic and independent schools, including child care centres and pre-schools, in the Blue Mountains local government area.
The RFS Commissioner prepared the community for the day ahead by stating that "This will be as bad as it gets. On days like [this], there's a very real potential for more loss of homes and life".
Wednesday, 23 October
In spite of the extreme fire danger warnings of 22 October, the weather was not as bad as predicted. The threat of damage was countermanded by the use of aircraft-borne heat-seeking infra-red scanning equipment and the diligence of RFS local brigade members.
Thursday, 24 October

Major fires

Greater Blue Mountains region
The most severe fires were located across the Greater Blue Mountains Area; with 210 houses and other buildings destroyed. By 22 October, the fires that originated in Lithgow and Mount Victoria had spread significantly from their original point of ignition and were deliberately merged through controlled burning by firefighters.

Lithgow
Some properties were lost in the fire, most of them being on the outskirts of the Lithgow district, where the fire burned. It burned out most of the northern region of the Blue Mountains National Park, parts of Wollemi National Park, and triggered the evacuation of most of the Lithgow region. An investigation later revealed that the fire was caused by explosives training which was being carried out by the Australian Defence Force. In 2013, a commission of inquiry as to the problems that led to the fire was begun before former Sydney judge, John O'Meally.

The iconic Zig Zag Railway was mostly destroyed by the State Mine fire. Due to re-open in November, after closure following accreditation issues with the New South Wales Government, the railway suffered millions of dollars of damage which included ten passenger carriages, accommodation carriages, a near-complete new shower block and meals room, spare parts centre and workshop. Much of the damage was suffered by original railway equipment from the 1920s. It is estimated that the railway would take a full year to recover from the State Mine fire.

Springwood

The fire in the  area began in bushland adjacent to Linksview Road, just before 1.30pm on 17 October. It has been alleged in a damages lawsuit to be caused by powerline damage due to strong winds felling a tree that had not been removed by the owner of the property on which it was located, however a Police investigation is still ongoing and is yet to determine the cause. A subsequent report described the damage in the Springwood, Mt Victoria and Lithgow fires that "took hold within minutes and went on to destroy a total of 203 homes and damage another 286." The report noted: "Financial losses have been estimated at around $170 million. Springwood Hospital was evacuated as were a number of nursing homes and several hundred children from schools."

Affected streets were Singles Ridge Road and most of the streets that intersect it, as well as some other nearby streets. The fire also impacted on the grounds of St Thomas Aquinas Primary School, and led to evacuations and lock-downs at several schools in Springwood and Winmalee that afternoon and evening. Over the following weeks, the fire spread to bushland in Faulconbridge, but firefighters successfully protected residential properties there.

Mount Victoria
The fire crossed to the west of Mount York Road and threatened properties in the Kanimbla and Megalong valleys. Back burning efforts by the RFS overnight on 21–22 October introduced 'The Plug', which forced the deliberate merger of the Mount Victoria fire with the fires that originated near Lithgow. 'The Plug' was the brain child of a long term resident, former National Parks Officer, serving Rural Fire Service Officer and general font of fire-fighting knowledge in the Blue Mountains, Peter Verhoeven. Authorities were concerned that weather conditions forecast for 23 October could drive the now merged fire eastwards, with little chance of stopping it, resulting in potentially disastrous impacts on many towns in the Blue Mountains. Consequently, the NSW Government ordered the closure of every school and child care centre on 23 October, and urged all residents of the Blue Mountains who did not need to be in the mountains to leave early that day prior to 9am to prevent possible loss of life and traffic congestion should fire fighting equipment needed to be moved rapidly. Hundreds of mountains residents left either on the 22nd or very early morning the 23rd ensuring fire fighters could work without hassle.

Fortunately the weather was not quite as bad as forecast and fire fighters were able to slow its progress with most of the fire activity taking place around the State Mine fire on the Bells Line of Road.

Hawkesbury

Hunter and Central Coast regions
Major bushfires at several locations in the Hunter and Central Coast regions caused significant damage and posed threats to people and property. There was one fatality in the  area, on 17 October, where a man died of a heart attack trying to defend his own home.

Great Lakes and Upper Hunter

Port Stephens
Overnight, fire authorities had downgraded the bushfire to 'watch and act' level, but warned that a predicted southerly change could spread the blaze.

A fire that started on 13 October 2013 to the east of Hank Street in Heatherbrae burnt out large sections of bushland in Heatherbrae and  almost reaching the Hunter River to the south, resulting in the closure of Cabbage Tree Road, from the Pacific Highway to Nelson Bay Road. Near the Heatherbrae roundabout embers from the fire started a secondary blaze that burned a portion of the grass median of the Pacific Highway northeast of the roundabout. The main fire forced the closure of Masonite Road and Camfield Drive, but remained east of the Pacific Highway. After a southerly wind change, the fire headed northeast, burning more of the Raymond Terrace and Williamtown bushland, surrounding Newcastle Airport and RAAF Base Williamtown on three sides, but remaining west of Medowie Road. At , north of Williamtown, the fire crossed Richardson Road burning much of the Campvale bushland. To the west, the fire remained east of the Pacific Highway, stopping just short of the Lakeside area, the easternmost subdivision of Raymond Terrace. Although homes were threatened, none were lost. Two boys, aged eleven and 15, have been charged for starting the fire.

Newcastle

Lake Macquarie

Central Coast
Fires on the Central Coast were centred around the  area. The fire peaked on 18 October, with the main concern placed on residents living in the  area. Large areas of forest in the Munmorah State Conservation Area were burned.

Southern Highlands

In the Southern Highlands region, a fire that originated in the village of Balmoral in the Wingecarribee local government area was centred on the Hall Road fire, that broke containment lines on 17 October; and headed towards . Flames of up  were reported. By 21 October, the fire warning was downgraded. Over  were burnt.

Other areas
In the period from 13 October, fires were scattered across the state, concentrated along the Great Dividing Range. On the NSW South Coast, a fire near Wirritin in the Shoalhaven local government area, west of Ulladulla burnt  of bushland; and claimed the life of the pilot of a plane which crashed while fighting fires in the rugged bushland.

Damage and effects
Two fatalities were attributed to the fires. At least 248 dwellings and other buildings were destroyed; with 193 properties destroyed and 109 damaged in the lower Blue Mountains at Springwood, Winmalee and Yellow Rock.

HSC examinations in some regions were affected by the bushfires. Among the schools affected by the fires, St. Columba's Catholic College, close to the Linksview Road Fire were evacuated mid-exam. Springwood High School and Winmalee High School. Lake Munmorah High School near the Ruttleys Road Fire was also evacuated. NSW Minister for Education Adrian Piccoli advised school students and parents attending affected schools, "Students should not take risks to get to an exam. The first priority for every student is to make sure that they are safe,". On 23 October every school in the Blue Mountains was closed to facilitate the work of the emergency services and to encourage residents to leave the mountains that day for their own safety.

Transport across the state was severely affected at its peak on 17 and 18 October and again on 23 October. Southwest of Sydney, the Hume Motorway was closed in both directions as a result of the bushfire at Balmoral. In the Blue Mountains, the Bells Line of Road was closed in both directions. The Great Western Highway, whilst not closed, was impacted by high traffic loads. The Pacific Highway was also closed in both directions from Swansea to Lake Munmorah between 17 and 18 October due to the fire at Lake Munmorah; and again on 23 October between Beresfield and Seahampton, caused by the fire at Minmi. Buses replaced trains on sections of the Blue Mountains and Southern Highlands railway lines. As motorists sought alternate routes, congestion was felt on the Illawarra Highway, the Princes Highway and the Pacific Motorway.

Response

The New South Wales Rural Fire Service and Fire and Rescue NSW responded to up to 100 fires on 17 October. On 19 October crews from fire authorities in Victoria, South Australia, Tasmania, the Australian Capital Territory and Queensland joined to assist NSW emergency services' teams. Additional support was provided from fire authorities interstate again on 23 October. Approximately  firefighters, deployed on rotation, and 200 fire engines were operational in the Blue Mountains area alone. The Prime Minister, Tony Abbott, confirmed on 19 October that bushfire-affected communities would have access to disaster assistance in nineteen local government areas.

, A$5.5 million had been raised via public appeals from The Salvation Army, the St Vincent de Paul Society, the Australian Red Cross, ANGLICARE Diocese of Sydney and the Blue Mountains City Council Mayoral Relief Fund, asking for people to donate cash, rather than goods. On behalf of the royal family, Charles, Prince of Wales, donated an undisclosed amount to the Australian Red Cross. Personal messages of support and sympathy were received by the Governor of New South Wales from Australia's monarch, Queen Elizabeth II, and Pope Francis.

Under the Australian Government Disaster Recovery Payment scheme, people affected were eligible for a A$1000 cash payment for adults and A$400 for each child, subject to certain conditions for residents within the Blue Mountains, Lithgow, Muswellbrook, Port Macquarie-Hastings, Port Stephens, Wingecarribee and Wyong local government areas. A range of relief measures, including personal hardship and distress assistance, were made available by the NSW Government via the Ministry for Police and Emergency Services.

In the worst affected area of the Blue Mountains, the risk of asbestos contamination forced authorities to ban owners and the public from visiting houses destroyed by fire, until clearance was given. A recovery centre was established at Springwood, an animal evacuation shelter at Hawkesbury Showground, and emergency authorities conducted numerous meetings in locations where fires threatened communities. The NSW Government appointed Phil Koperberg to the position of Blue Mountains Bushfire Recovery Coordinator.

International media coverage
The bushfires received prominent coverage on the BBC News, with correspondent, Jon Donnison filing:
For families living around the small community of Springwood in the Blue Mountains, many have had their lives turned upside down. Australians are well used to the threat of bush fires, but nothing can prepare you for the moment when you return home to find your house and everything inside utterly gutted by fire. Several fires are still burning around Springwood. Relays of helicopters whirr through the smoky haze, dumping water to try and douse the flames. A drop in the temperature today has given fire fighters a window to try and get on top of the situation before the weekend, when the mercury is expected to rise again. It's only spring here. The fear is of a long and difficult summer fire season.

Other international coverage was also provided by The New York Times, CNN, Al Jazeera, The Guardian including on the UK-site homepage, and the New Zealand Herald.

Political debate
On 21 October, Christiana Figueres, a UN official on climate change, told CNN:
The World Meteorological Organization has not established a direct link between this wildfire and climate change – yet. But what is absolutely clear is the science is telling us that there are increasing heat waves in Asia, Europe, and Australia; that there these will continue; that they will continue in their intensity and in their frequency.

The Prime Minister, Tony Abbott, criticised earlier comments made by Australian Greens' MP Adam Bandt, with Abbott stating on 17 October that "Australia is a country which is prone to natural disaster but every time it strikes, it hurts and we grieve for all of those who are now hurting because of what's happened in NSW". Abbott dismissed the claims made by Figueres and in an interview on national radio stated that "Climate change is real as I've often said and we should take strong action against it. But these fires are certainly not a function of climate change, they're a function of life in Australia." Abbott's comments attracted a stern rebuke from former US Vice President Al Gore.

See also

 List of disasters in Australia by death toll
 Bushfires in Australia
 List of Australian bushfire seasons

References

External links

 Photo gallery of the fires

New South Wales bushfires
New South Wales bushfires
Bushfires in New South Wales
2013 bushfires
October 2013 events in Australia